{{Infobox California State Legislature district
| district = 2
| chamber = Assembly
| image = California AD-02 (2011).svg
| population = 471, 072 <ref name="population">

California's 2nd State Assembly district is one of 80 California State Assembly districts. It is currently represented by Democrat Jim Wood of Santa Rosa.

District profile 
The district encompasses the North Coast, stretching from the Oregon border to Bodega Bay and Santa Rosa. The district is primarily rural.

All of Del Norte County
 Crescent City

All of Humboldt County
 Arcata
 Blue Lake
 Eureka
 Ferndale
 Fortuna
 Rio Dell
 Trinidad

All of Mendocino County
 Fort Bragg
 Point Arena
 Ukiah
 Willits

Sonoma County – 41.0%
 Bodega Bay
 Cloverdale
 Healdsburg
 Santa Rosa – 55.8%
 Windsor

All of Trinity County
 Weaverville

Election results from statewide races

List of assembly members 
Due to redistricting, the 2nd district has been moved around different parts of the state. The current iteration resulted from the 2011 redistricting by the California Citizens Redistricting Commission.

Election results 1992 - present

2020

2018

2016

2014

2012

2010

2008

2006

2004

2002

2000

1998

1996

1994

1992

See also 
 California State Assembly
 California State Assembly districts
 Districts in California

References

External links 
 District map from the California Citizens Redistricting Commission

02
Government of Del Norte County, California
Government of Humboldt County, California
Government of Mendocino County, California
Government of Sonoma County, California
Government of Trinity County, California
Crescent City, California
Eureka, California
Lakeport, California
Santa Rosa, California
Ukiah, California
Weaverville, California